Go for gold may refer to:

Go for Gold (film), a 1984 movie by Stuart F. Fleming
 "Go for Gold", a 1988 hit song by German band The Winners written for the 1988 Olympics
 "Go for Gold!", a 1991 episode of The Raccoons
 Go For Gold (sports program), a private sports sponsorship program in the Philippines
 Go for Gold Philippines, a UCI Continental road cycling team based in the Philippines